Bullard is a surname.

Bullard may also refer to:

Places
In the United States
Bullard, former name of Figarden, California
Bullard, Georgia
Bullard Creek, a stream in Minnesota
Bullard Township, Minnesota
Bullard, Texas
Bullard Mountain, in Alaska

Organizations and institutions
Bullard Independent School District
Bullard High School (Bullard, Texas) 
Bullard High School (Fresno, California)
Bullard Machine Tool Company

Other uses
USS Bullard (DD-660), a destroyerStamford bull run
 Bullard, a participant in bull running
 Bullards' Song, about the Stamford bull run